Carlo Carfagna (born 1940 in Guarcino, Italy) is an Italian classical guitarist, author of many musical publications. His musical education took place at the Conservatory of Rome and Naples, under the guidance of Mario Gangi, and was subsequently a teaching colleague for many years at Santa Cecilia.

Publications

Transcriptions and revisions
Main works

 Integral edition in three volumes of Fernando Sor's Studies for guitar.
 Integral edition in three volumes of Francisco Tárrega's works.
 Revision of the four Lute Suites by Johann Sebastian Bach.
 Revision of the four sonatas by Sor

He published with the following firms: Bèrben (Ancona), Ricordi (Milan), Music Inc. (Dallas), Nicolai (Rome), Domani Musica (Rome), Erom (Rome).

Essays
 Profilo storico della chitarra, (with Alberto Caprani), Bèrben, Ancona, 1966
 Dizionario Chitarristico Italiano (with Mario Gangi), Bèrben, Ancona, 1968
 Liuteria Classica Italiana, chitarre del XIX e XX secolo (with Giovanni Antonioni), Camerata Musicale Barese, 1985
 Chitarra - Storia e Immagini (with Michele Greci), Fratelli Palombi Editori, Roma, 2000
 Il libretto per musica e Metastasio, Erom, Rome, 2005
 Aspetti della Chitarra nell'Ottocento, Erom, Rome, 2006
 He has written together with Mario Gangi the article Guitar in the Musical Encyclopedia edited by Fratelli Fabbri Editori
 He has written many essays on guitar-specific newspapers (even small treatises on History of art)
 He has cowritten with Gian Paolo Chiti a little multimedia opera, Matrona quaedam.

Italian classical guitarists
Italian male guitarists
1940 births
Living people